Digital at Montreux is a 1979 live album by Oscar Peterson, accompanied by Niels-Henning Ørsted Pedersen, recorded at the 1979 Montreux Jazz Festival.

Track listing
 "Old Folks" (Dedette Lee Hill, Willard Robison) – 5:29
 "Soft Winds" (Benny Goodman, Fletcher Henderson) – 5:43
 "(Back Home Again In) Indiana" (James F. Hanley, Ballard MacDonald) – 5:09
 "That's All" (Alan Brandt, Bob Haymes) – 3:02
 "Younger Than Springtime" (Oscar Hammerstein II, Richard Rodgers) – 4:45
 Duke Ellington Medley: "Caravan"/"Rockin' in Rhythm"/"C Jam Blues"/"(In My) Solitude"/"Satin Doll"/"Caravan" (reprise) (Juan Tizol, Duke Ellington)/(Harry Carney, Ellington, Irving Mills)/(Ellington)/(Ellington, Eddie DeLange)/(Ellington, Johnny Mercer, Billy Strayhorn) – 7:36
 "On the Trail" (Harold Adamson, Ferde Grofé) – 8:51

Personnel

Performance
 Oscar Peterson – piano
 Niels-Henning Ørsted Pedersen – double bass

References

Oscar Peterson live albums
Albums produced by Norman Granz
Albums recorded at the Montreux Jazz Festival
1979 live albums
Pablo Records live albums